Facundo Ismael Castro Soto (born 22 January 1995) is an Uruguayan professional footballer who plays as a right winger for Chilean Primera División side O'Higgins.

References

External links
 
 
 
 

1995 births
Living people
Uruguayan footballers
Uruguayan expatriate footballers
Defensor Sporting players
Club Necaxa footballers
O'Higgins F.C. footballers
Uruguayan Primera División players
Liga MX players
Chilean Primera División players
Expatriate footballers in Mexico
Expatriate footballers in Chile
Association football forwards
Uruguayan expatriate sportspeople in Mexico
Uruguayan expatriate sportspeople in Chile
Uruguay under-20 international footballers
Footballers from Montevideo
Pan American Games gold medalists for Uruguay
Footballers at the 2015 Pan American Games
Pan American Games medalists in football
Medalists at the 2015 Pan American Games